Yevgeny Zaytsev (born 16 February 1965) is a Soviet southpaw boxer. He competed in the men's light middleweight event at the 1988 Summer Olympics.

References

1965 births
Living people
Soviet male boxers
Southpaw boxers
Olympic boxers of the Soviet Union
Boxers at the 1988 Summer Olympics
Place of birth missing (living people)
Light-middleweight boxers